Jong Yu-Ri (정유리) (born 21 June 1992) is a North Korean footballer who plays as a midfielder who plays for the North Korea women's national football team. She was part of the team at the 2014 Asian Games and 2014 Algarve Cup. At the club level, she played for Sobaeksu Sports Club in North Korea.

References

External links
 

1992 births
Living people
North Korean women's footballers
North Korea women's international footballers
Place of birth missing (living people)
Women's association football midfielders
Footballers at the 2014 Asian Games
Asian Games gold medalists for North Korea
Asian Games medalists in football
Medalists at the 2014 Asian Games